Trevor Ivory Ltd v Anderson is one of the leading New Zealand cases regarding the personal liability of company directors. The case concerns the personal liability of a director of a one-man company for negligent misstatement and applied the principle of Tesco Supermarkets Ltd v Nattrass that where a director is the "directing mind" of a company, his actions are legally those of the company. The application of the case by New Zealand courts during the leaky homes crisis has been described as a "barrier to litigants recovering from directors of these companies".

Background

Trevor Ivory Ltd was a one-man company run by Trevor Ivory in the Nelson province and described as "agricultural and horticultural supplies and advisory service". In 1983, Trevor Ivory Limited entered into an oral contract with raspberry orchardists for the provision of consultancy services and the supply of sprays and fertilisers. The orchardists sought advice under the agreement about the spread of couch grass which was threatening their raspberry plantation and in March 1985 Mr Ivory recommended a trial spray of Roundup.

The trial spray had no immediate ill-effects and so Mr Ivory advised spraying all of the couch grass with Roundup. President Cooke described what happened thus,

The raspberry orchardists sued Trevor Ivory in negligence and Heron J in the Nelson High Court found in their favour and awarded damages of $145,332 plus interest. The award of damages was made on the basis that the company was liable for breach of contract and negligent misstatement and that Mr Ivory was also personally liable for negligent misstatement.

Mr Ivory and Trevor Ivory Ltd appealed the decision that he was personally liable for negligent misstatement; the judges alleged failure to consider contributory negligence; and the quantum of damages. The Court of Appeal dismissed the appeal except on the question of personal liability.

Judgments
The main point that the Court considered was whether Mr Ivory was personally liable for negligent advice given in the course of his company's operations. The unanimous decision of the Court was that Mr Ivory was not personally liable

Cooke P
In his judgement Cooke P restated the "elementary" law that "an incorporated company and any shareholder are separate legal entities, no matter that the shareholder may have absolute control."

Cooke P then surveyed Commonwealth case law that showed that a company officer or agent may, in certain circumstances, "come under a personal duty to a third party, breach of which ay entail personal liability".

Expanding on this point Cooke P noted,

Hardie Boys J
In his own judgement Justice Hardie Boys discussed the central importance of a director assuming responsibility, either expressly or by imputation and, noted the current case was "approaching the borderline" and that, "It may be that in the present case there would have been a sufficient assumption of responsibility had Mr Ivory undertaken to do the spraying himself, but it is not necessary to consider that possibility."

Hardie Boys J stated that one of the key hurdles in this area of law was establishing that a director owed a personal duty of care because his acts were his acts as the agent of the company and not of the company itself.

 

This could happen in certain situations, Hardie Boys J believed, "Assumption of responsibility may well arise or be imputed where the director or employee exercises particular control or control over a particular operation or activity".

McGechan J
Justice McGechan concurred with the rest of the Court, expressly noting of the argument given by counsel for the raspberry orchardists, "It may indeed be drawing the long bow to apply a Hedley Byrne approach so as to impose personal liability upon the managing director of a one-man company, in rural New Zealand".

Significance
The case remains the benchmark in New Zealand law for establishing whether a director's action are those of the company or those of herself as an individual. However this area of law, which has received frequent attention due to the leaky homes crisis, remains unstable. The importance of the case has been eroded by the decision of the Court of Appeal in Body Corporate 202254 v Taylor [2009] 2 NZLR 17. As two commercial law academics reported, "New Zealand cases subsequent to Trevor Ivory have done little but create uncertainty for litigants. The courts’ approaches have varied widely with some judges applying Trevor Ivory and others making every effort to distinguish it."

References

Court of Appeal of New Zealand cases
1991 in New Zealand law
1991 in case law
New Zealand tort case law
Corporate case law